A mogroside is a glycoside of cucurbitane derivatives found in certain plants, such as the fruit of the gourd vine Siraitia grosvenorii (known as monkfruit or luo han guo). Mogrosides are extracted from S. grosvenorii and used in the manufacture of sugar substitutes.

Mogrosides

Mogrosides include:

 Mogrol
 Mogroside II A1
 Mogroside II B
 7-Oxomogroside II E
 11-Oxomogroside A1
 Mogroside III A2
 11-Deoxymogroside III
 11-Oxomogroside IV A
 Mogroside V
 7-Oxomogroside V
 11-Oxo-mogroside V
 Mogroside VI

Mogroside V is the main component of Siraitia grosvenorii fruit, constituting 0.5% to 1.4% of the dried fruit.

Biosynthesis
One analysis of 200 candidate genes of Siraitia grosvenorii revealed five enzyme families involved in the synthesis of mogroside V: squalene epoxidases, triterpenoid synthases, epoxide hydrolases, cytochrome P450s, and UDP-glucosyltransferases. The metabolic pathway for mogroside biosynthesis involves an initial stage of fruit development when squalene is metabolized to di-glucosylated, tetra-hydroxycucurbitadienols, then during fruit maturation, branched glucosyl groups are added and catalyzed, leading to the sweet M4, M5, and M6 mogrosides.

Stability 
Mogroside V appears to be heat stable in the range of 100 to 150 degrees Celsius for 4 hours and up to 8 hours in boiling water. It is stable at a pH of between 3 and 12 when stored from 2 to 8 degrees Celsius.

Uses 
Some mogrosides are used in traditional Chinese medicine and some are extracted for manufacturing as sweeteners. Mogroside V extract from S. grosvenorii fruit is 250 times sweeter than sucrose, sold commercially in Norbu (sweetener).

References

External links

Triterpene glycosides
Sugar substitutes